María Pérez Fernández (born 28 March 1987), also known as Peque, is a Spanish former footballer who played as a striker.

Career

She began playing football at Sporting de Gijón's installations in the Escuela de Fútbol de Mareo. At 16, she began her career in Oviedo Moderno. Later she signed for Levante UD, the defending Primera División champion. In the summer of 2010, she moved to Prainsa Zaragoza, which she left one year later to play for Iceland's Þór/KA for two months. Following the end of the season for Þór/KA she returned to Levante. In 2014, she signed for Italian club Torres. Half a year later, she announced her return to the Escuela de Fútbol de Mareo.

References

1987 births
Living people
Spanish women's footballers
Primera División (women) players
Levante UD Femenino players
Women's association football forwards
Þór/KA players
Real Oviedo (women) players
Footballers from Gijón
Zaragoza CFF players